The Fiat 128 is a transverse front-engine, front wheel drive small family car manufactured and marketed by Fiat from 1969 to 1985 as a two- or four-door sedan, three- or five-door station wagon as well as two- or three-door coupé. The 128 running gear and engine, reconfigured for a mid-engined layout, were used in the Fiat X1/9 sports car.

Named European Car of the Year in 1970, over three million were manufactured.

The 128 was noted for its innovative front-engine, front-drive layout, which enabled an especially large interior volume and ultimately became the predominant front engine/drive layout, worldwide.  In 2012 automotive journalist Jamie Kitman called the 128 a "pioneer of the small cars we drive today."

Development
With engineering by Dante Giacosa and engine design by Aurelio Lampredi, the 128 was noted for its relatively roomy passenger and cargo volume — enabled by a breakthrough innovation to the front-engine, front-drive layout which became the layout "adopted by virtually every other manufacturer in the world" for front-wheel drive. Giorgetto Giugiaro noted that in 1970, Volkswagen completely dismantled a Fiat 128, recognizing it as the reference for their forthcoming Golf.

Fiat promoted in its advertising that mechanical features consumed only 20% of the vehicle's volume and that Enzo Ferrari drove a 128 as his personal vehicle."

Fiat built an entirely new plant in Rivalta, north-west of Turin, specifically to manufacture the new 128. In all, 2,776,000 sedans and wagons were built in Italy, plus 330,800 coupés and 3Ps.

Front drive innovation
 
Front-wheel drive had previously been introduced to small, inexpensive cars by BMC, firstly with the Mini in 1959 and then with the larger 1100/1300 series in 1962.  During the mid-1960s, Fiat set about designing a new car to compete with the latter. The BMC design of Alec Issigonis had the transmission and engine sharing a single oil sump — despite disparate lubricating requirements — and located the engine's radiator at the side of the engine, away from the flow of fresh air and drawing heated rather than cool air over the engine. The layout often required the engine to be removed to service the clutch.

The Fiat 128's arrangement had numerous differences.  As engineered by Dante Giacosa, it featured a transverse-mounted engine with unequal-length drive shafts and an innovative clutch release mechanism — an arrangement which Fiat had strategically tested on a previous production model for a full five years, the Primula from its less market-critical subsidiary, Autobianchi. The layout enabled the engine and gearbox to be located side by side without sharing lubricating fluid while orienting an electrically controlled cooling fan toward fresh air flow. By using the Primula as a test-bed, Fiat was able to sufficiently resolve the layout's disadvantages, including uneven side-to-side power transmission, uneven tire wear and potential torque steer, the tendency for the power of the engine alone to steer the car under heavy acceleration.

The compact and efficient layout — a transversely-mounted engine with transmission mounted beside the engine driving the front wheels through an offset final-drive and unequal-length driveshafts — subsequently became common with competitors and arguably an industry standard.

The layout was sufficiently flexible that Fiat reconfigured the 128 drive-train as a mid-engined layout for the Fiat X1/9.

Design
The all new 1.1 litre Fiat SOHC engine, engineered by noted engine designer Aurelio Lampredi, featured an iron block mated to an aluminum head along with a belt-driven single overhead camshaft producing 49 hp.

The 128 was styled similarly to the 124 and 125 and featured rack-and-pinion steering, Pirelli 145R13 Cinturato or 145R13 Michelin ZX radial tyres, front disc brakes, independent rear suspension with a transverse leaf spring, and a strut-type front suspension with integral anti-roll bar.

Initially, the 128 was available as a two-door or four-door sedan. At the 1970 Turin Motor Show a three-door station wagon model called "Familiare" was added to the line-up. The car was only available with a 1116 cc engine on launch, though the two-door-only 128 Rally edition launched in 1971 used a 1,290 cc unit. Also in 1971, the Sport Coupé, an all-new coupé body on a shortened 128 platform, was unveiled at the Turin Show. On launch it was available with both existing 128 engines.

The 128 range underwent a facelift in 1972, featuring a revised grille. 1974 saw the launch of the 128 Special, which used the Rally engine in a four-door sedan body. In 1975 the 128 3P (3-door) Berlinetta replaced the Sport Coupé. In 1976, the range received new bumpers, rectangular headlights, tail lights and dashboard as well as modifications to the engines. At this time, the wagon was also renamed the "Panorama".

Production of all 128s except that of the base 1,100 cc powered model ended in 1979 after the introduction of the Fiat Ritmo/Strada in 1978. In 1980 production of the small three-door station wagon Panorama was dropped from the range and 128 production finally ended in 1985.

Road test
The British "Motor" magazine tested a Fiat 128 in April 1970, shortly after its UK launch. This put it fractionally behind the contemporary Morris 1300 on maximum speed but usefully ahead on acceleration. The two were closely matched on fuel economy, where both were outrun by the Ford Escort 1300 Super also included in the comparison, here in its four-door version. The Fiat's £876 manufacturer's recommended price was not too far above the Morris 1300's £830 and the Escort's £838. The testers commended the Fiat's interior space and excellent performance. Wind and road noise were low, but engine noise was not. The 128 went on sale on the UK market around the same time as the Rootes Group's Hillman Avenger, and shortly before the Vauxhall Viva was transformed from its second generation to its third generation. The market leader in this sector at the time was British Leyland's 1100 and 1300 range. Sales of imported cars in the UK were in the first stages of a sharp rise in their market share at the beginning of the 1970s, with Fiat and likes of Datsun, Renault and Volkswagen being particularly successful.

Variants

128 Rally

The Fiat 128 Rally was a sporty, 1.3-litre-engined version of the 128 two-door saloon, introduced at the 41st Geneva Motor Show in March 1971 and produced up to 1974.

There was also a twin-choke Weber 32 DMTR carburettor, revised valve timing and a slightly higher 8.9:1 compression ratio.
Other mechanical improvements were the addition of a vacuum servo, an engine protection plate, better tyres, new gear ratios for the 4-speed transmission, a higher capacity battery and an alternator in place of the dynamo).

A number of exterior features set the Rally apart from other 128s. At the front there was a black radiator grille, carrying the round Fiat emblem typical of the marque's sports cars; split bumpers joined by a tubular steel bar; and halogen headlamps and bumper-mounted auxiliary lamps. At the rear dual round tail lamps replaced the square ones found on the regular two-door 128. "Rally" badging on the bonnet and boot lid and stripes along the side sills completed the sporty look.
The interior was upholstered in black leatherette, and the dashboard housed upgraded instrumentation: a tachometer was standard equipment, and water temperature and oil pressure gauges took the place of the ashtray, relocated to the centre console. Front sports seats with headrests and a two-spoke sports steering wheel replaced the standard items.

In October 1972 Fiat introduced several updates to the whole 128 saloon and Familiare range, including the 128 Rally. In particular the Rally received new upholstery (leatherette with cloth seat centres) and a black plastic protection to the front bumper tube.

128 Coupé and 3P

At the 53rd Turin Motor Show of November 1971 Fiat introduced the 128 Coupé, also called 128 Sport, a 2-door, 4-seat coupé based on a shortened 128 chassis. It was produced until 1975, but in latter years sales were dropping off considerably in favor of the mid-engined X1/9. Since Fiat had to pay a commission to Bertone for every X1/9, it was decided to provide some internal competition in the form of the updated hatchback coupé 128 3P. "3P" stands for Tre Porte, or "Three Doors" in Italian. The 128 3P used the existing design back to the B-pillar, with some detail modifications to the grille and headlights.

The Coupé version was available with two different engines (1100 and 1300) and in two different trim levels (S and SL) for a total of four variants.
In its base "S" trim, the coupé had single rectangular front headlamps, and wheels and hubcaps from the saloon. The pricier "SL" (for Sport Lusso) was distinguished by quadruple round headlamps, a specific grille, steel sport wheels without hubcaps, chromed window surround trim, door handles and fuel cap, and black decorative striping along the sills and across the tail panel. Inside it gained a leatherette-wrapped steering wheels, perforated leatherette upholstery, extended four-gauge instrumentation, loop pile carpeting and black headlining.

The two engines were developed from the units found in the 128 saloon and 128 Rally respectively, and both were fitted with twin-choke carburettors and a two-piece exhaust manifold.
Compared with the 128 saloon, the coupé had a  shorter wheelbase (at ), and tracks 20 mm wider at the front and 45 mm narrower at the rear.
Suspension was the familiar all-independent 128 layout—save for the front anti-roll bar, which had been replaced by radius rods.
The braking system consisted of discs at the front and drums at the rear; it was made more efficient by fitting smaller diameter front discs and the front and the vacuum servo first used on the 128 Rally.

Licensed production

Argentina
In Argentina, the 128 was produced from 1971 to 1990 by Sevel Argentina as a four-door sedan or five-door wagon, the Fiat 128 Rural, the latter unique to Argentina. Several trims and versions were available, including the IAVA sport series. In 1983 the car received a facelift with new headlamps, tail lamps and front grille, which was marketed as the Fiat Super Europa.

Colombia
In Colombia, the Fiat 128 was produced by "Compañía Colombiana Automotriz" in Bogota between 1973 - 1980. Was only offered as a 4-door sedan. Between 1973 and 1978, it was marketed as Fiat 128 L, with a 1,300 cm³ 4-cylinder engine. Starting in 1978, a version with a 1,100-cubic-centimeter engine called the Fiat 128 San Remo was also offered.

Egypt
Until 2009, CKD kits from Zastava were manufactured by Egypt's Nasr car company as the Nasr 128.

Poland
The 128 was manufactured in Poland as the Zastava 1100p by FSO between 1971 to 1976.

Serbia

The 128 formed the basis of the Zastava 128 (four-door sedan) and Zastava 101 (three-door and five-door hatchbacks) ranges of cars manufactured by the "Zastava Automobili" company in Serbia. The 128-based Zastavas were available throughout Europe in the '70s. In Britain, three variants were offered: a three-door hatchback (Zastava Yugo 311/313), four-door saloon (Zastava Yugo 411/413) and a five-door hatchback (Zastava Yugo 511/513). As one of the Serbian automaker's most affordable models, production ended in November 2008.

South Africa
For South Africa only, a pickup version was also developed by Fiat in Italy to contest that country's popular "bakkie" category. It entered production in 1978.

Spain

In Spain, SEAT manufactured its own version of a 128 berlinetta coupé, called SEAT 128 3P. it was available with two engine options, the 1.2L and the more powerful and well-known 1430 engine from the SEAT 1430. Was marketed as "Three Times SEAT" in order to underline its triple combination ability of sportiness, versatility and design. The SEAT 128 never enjoyed great commercial success, however. 31,893 128s were made between 1976 - 1980.

Sri Lanka

In Sri Lanka, the Fiat 128 was manufactured by the Upali Motor Company until 1978. This car was commonly known as the Upali Fiat in Sri Lanka.

Cars developed from FIAT 128

Fiat X1/9

The Fiat X1/9 is a two-seater mid-engined sports car designed by Bertone and manufactured by Fiat from 1972–1982 and subsequently by Bertone from 1982–1989.

Designed around the Fiat SOHC engine and transmission from the front wheel drive Fiat 128, the X1/9 relocated the transverse drive train and suspension assembly from the front of the 128 to the rear of the passenger cabin, directly in front of the rear axle, giving a mid-engined layout. With a transverse engine and gearbox in a mid-mounted, rear-wheel drive configuration, the X1/9 was noted for its balanced handling.

Moretti 128
The Moretti Motor Company of Turin, Italy produced the Fiat 128-based Moretti 128 in coupé and cabriolet versions.

Built in the plants of via Monginevro in a semi-handmade way (these custom-built cars were not assembled in a chain) and in a very limited number (less than a hundred), it cost about 1,500,000 lire in 1969. The interior was very neat and could be customized with many accessories (sports steering wheel, electric windows, leather upholstery ...). In 1975, the two models underwent a slight restyling (new black bumpers, wider) and equipped with the 1290 cm3 - 60 HP engine of the contemporary Special sedan.

Sears XDH-1

Sears XDH-1 is an experimental electric car built for Sears, Roebuck and Company by their DieHard battery supplier Johnson Controls (Globe Union) in 1977 to celebrate the 10th anniversary of its DieHard brand of car batteries. The car was a Fiat 128 Coupé equipped with 20 DieHard (12-inch deep cycle marine) batteries, and an electric motor.

References

Notes

Bibliography

External links

Fiat 128 enthusiasts' site
Zastava Skala 55 presentation (in Serbian)

128
1970s cars
1980s cars
Cars introduced in 1969
Compact cars
Sedans
Station wagons
Coupés